Robert James Woodman (born 12 October 1986) is an English former professional cricketer who played for Somerset and Gloucestershire. He played as a left-handed batsman and left-arm fast-medium bowler. 

, he is the head of cricket at King’s College, Taunton.

References

External links
 

1986 births
Living people
English cricketers
Somerset cricketers
Gloucestershire cricketers
Devon cricketers
Marylebone Cricket Club cricketers
Sportspeople from Taunton